Espinho Branco is a village  in the northern part of the island of Santiago, Cape Verde. In 2010 its population was 869. It is situated near the coast, 5 km northwest of Calheta de São Miguel. Espinho Branco is known for its community of Rabelados, a group of people who opposed reforms of the Catholic church and maintain a traditional way of life.

References

São Miguel, Cape Verde
Villages and settlements in Santiago, Cape Verde